Café Hawelka is a traditional Viennese café located at Dorotheergasse 6 in the Innere Stadt, the first district of Vienna, Austria.

History

The Café Hawelka was opened by Leopold Hawelka in 1939. Hawelka had previously operated the Kaffee Alt Wien on Bäckerstraße since 1936 and together with his wife Josefine took over the Café Ludwig in the Dorotheergasse in May 1939. This spot was originally the location of the "Chatham Bar" opened in 1906. For two decades in recent past it was wrongly believed that the original venue was called "Je t'aime-Bar". After the outbreak of World War II, the Hawelka had to be closed, and in Fall 1945 it was reopened in the still largely intact building.

After the end of the period of occupation after 1955, the café quickly became a meeting point for writers and critics like Heimito von Doderer, Albert Paris Gütersloh, Hilde Spiel, Friedrich Torberg and Hans Weigel. After the closing of the Café Herrenhof in 1961, even more artists gathered here and it became a central meeting place in the art scene of the time. Regular guests included Friedrich Achleitner, H. C. Artmann, Konrad Bayer, Ernst Fuchs, Friedensreich Hundertwasser, Rudolf Hausner, Wolfgang Hutter, Helmut Qualtinger, Gerhard Rühm, and Oskar Werner. In the sixties and seventies the café experienced its peak. The artistic atmosphere of the café also inspired Georg Danzer's 1976 song Jö, schau (...was macht ein Nackerter im Hawelka).

Josefine Hawelka died on 22 March 2005 after managing the café for sixty-six years with her husband. She had baked the place's specialty, its Buchteln desserts (which are still made by Günther Hawelka, son of Josefine and Leopold according to the old recipe). Until his death in 2011, Leopold Hawelka could still be found sitting at its entrance, greeting guests.

Melange
Café Hawelka serves a Melange (similar to a cappuccino) at a cost of €4.20 (as of May 2018).

See also
 List of restaurants in Vienna

Further reading
 Franz Hubmann: Café Hawelka - Ein Wiener Mythos, Christian Brandstätter, 2001 
 Königin Josefine. Die Hawelkas und ihr Café (2002), a documentary film written and directed by Andrea Eckert.
 Kurt-Juergen Heering: Das Wiener Kaffeehaus: Mit Hinweisen auf Wiener Kaffeehäuser, Insel Verlag, 2002 
 Der Standard Josefine Hawelka an Herzversagen gestorben, 30.03.2005
 Der Standard "Poiderl, was mach ma denn" - zum 95er, Marijana Miljkovic, 12.04.2006
 Der Standard Literarisiertes Wohnzimmer, Gregor Auenhammer, 24.12.2009
 Der Standard Ehrung für das "Hawelka", 14.12.2009
 Das Hawelka. Geschichte & Legende, by Sonja Moser, 2009,

External links
 www.hawelka.at Homepage of the café
 www.café-hawelka.info.eu Map and Information
 www.foto-welten.de/ Photos from the Hawelka
 Interactive panorama inside of the Hawelka ( Flash ) 
 Poster of Coffee Places "where one can think" created by Ariel Rubinstein

Coffeehouses and cafés in Vienna
Buildings and structures in Innere Stadt